The 1913 Toronto Argonauts season was the 30th season for the team since the franchise's inception in 1873. The team finished in third place in the Interprovincial Rugby Football Union with a 3–3 record and failed to qualify for the playoffs.

Regular season

Standings

Schedule

(*) The October 18 game versus Ottawa that ended in a tie was replayed on Nov 15 and did not count towards the standings.

References

Toronto Argonauts seasons
1913 in Canadian football
Toronto Argonauts